Denmark is set to participate in the Eurovision Song Contest 2023 in Liverpool, United Kingdom, with "Breaking My Heart" performed by Reiley. The Danish broadcaster DR organised the national final  2023 in order to select the Danish entry. Eight songs competed in a televised show where the winner was decided upon through two rounds of voting.

Background 

In the 2022 contest, "The Show" performed by Reddi failed to qualify Denmark to the final.

The Danish national broadcaster, DR, broadcasts the event within Denmark and organises the selection process for the nation's entry. DR confirmed their intention to participate at the 2023 Eurovision Song Contest on 26 August 2022. Denmark has selected all of their Eurovision entries thus far through the national final Dansk Melodi Grand Prix. The broadcaster further announced that  2023 would be organised in order to select Denmark's entry for the 2023 contest.

Before Eurovision

2023 

Format 
Eight songs, all accompanied by the DR Grand Prix orchestra, competed in one show where the winner was determined over two rounds of voting. In the first round, the top three songs as determined exclusively on a public vote qualified to the superfinal. In the superfinal, the winner was determined based on the combination of votes from a public vote and a five-member jury panel. Viewers were able to vote via SMS or a newly introduced mobile application specifically designed for the competition. Viewers were able to vote via SMS or a mobile application specifically designed for the competition. Prior to the show, the public was provided with one free vote on the app to cast a vote each day between 6 and 10 February 2023, while viewers using the app during the show were provided with two free votes.

The five-member jury panel was composed of:
 Anders Stig Gehrt Nielsen (Anders SG) – musician 
  – singer-songwriter
 Emmelie de Forest – singer-songwriter, winner of the Eurovision Song Contest 2013
 Mich Hedin Hansen (Cutfather) – songwriter and music producer
 Ole Tøpholm – radio host on DR P3

Competing entries 
DR opened a submission period between 8 September 2022 and 28 October 2022 for artists and composers to submit their entries. The broadcaster stated that the competition would seek out songs that "represent the quality and breadth of the Danish music scene" with emphasis on songs that "have the potential to represent Danish music and Danish culture in the most distinguished way at the Eurovision Song Contest." The eight competing entries were announced on 19 January 2023 at DR Byen in Copenhagen. Two weeks before the national final, it was reported by Danish newspaper  that Reiley was at risk of disqualification from the competition, as it was revealed that he previously performed his entry "Breaking My Heart" at Slow Life Slow Live Festival in Seoul, South Korea, in October 2022. This was in contravention with the contest's rules that songs must not have been performed or released publicly prior to the contest without the broadcaster's permission. However, it was later decided by DR that the previous performance by Reiley did not give him a competitive advantage in relation to a Danish audience and participation in DMGP.

Final 
The final took place on 11 February 2023. The running order was determined by DR and announced on 31 January 2023. In the first round of voting the top three advanced to the superfinal based on the votes of a public vote. In the week leading up to the show, viewers could vote through the DR Grand Prix app. During the show, viewers could via through SMS and the app. In the first round of voting the three songs with the most votes received through SMS as well as by each of Denmark's regions and autonomous territories were announced, and the top three advanced to the superfinal. In the superfinal, the winner, "Breaking My Heart" performed by Reiley, was selected based on the votes of a five-member jury (50%) and a public vote (50%). In addition to the performances of the competing entries, Svea S and Ukrainian Eurovision Song Contest 2022 winner Kalush Orchestra performed as the interval acts.

It was reported by DR that DR Grand Prix, the app used for voting during the national final, crashed due to overload, which caused several breaks during the show. However, according to DMGP program manager Erik Struve, the results of the show were not affected by the app crash.

At Eurovision 
According to Eurovision rules, all nations with the exceptions of the host country and the "Big Five" (France, Germany, Italy, Spain and the United Kingdom) are required to qualify from one of two semi-finals in order to compete for the final; the top ten countries from each semi-final progress to the final. The European Broadcasting Union (EBU) split up the competing countries into six different pots based on voting patterns from previous contests, with countries with favourable voting histories put into the same pot. On 31 January 2023, an allocation draw was held, which placed each country into one of the two semi-finals, and determined which half of the show they would perform in. Denmark has been placed into the second semi-final, to be held on 11 May 2023, and has been scheduled to perform in the first half of the show.

References

External links 
 

2023
Countries in the Eurovision Song Contest 2023
Eurovision